Kateh Shamshir may refer to:
 Kateh Shamshir-e Olya
 Kateh Shamshir-e Sofla